Norwood Memorial Airport  is a public airport  east of Norwood, in Norfolk County, Massachusetts, United States. It is home to the offices of prominent local business people and several maintenance facilities. 

As Outlying Landing Field Norwood, the airfield was a Naval Outlying Landing Field located in Norwood, Massachusetts operational from 1942 to 1945. It existed as an outlying field of Naval Air Station Squantum and was used by student pilots to gain flight experience on its two  runways. The 1946 chart shows it as a civil airfield. It took the place of the former Boston Metropolitan Airport in Canton, Massachusetts.

Facilities

 17/35: , asphalt
 10/28: , asphalt

In the year ending January 31, 2020 the airport had 58,628 aircraft operations, an average of 161 per day: 91% general aviation, 9% air taxi and less than 1% military.

In April 2022, there were 101 aircraft based at this airport: 72 single-engine, 9 multi-engine, 7 jet and 13 helicopter.

The airport has two flight schools and Flight Level Aviation as an FBO. Charter services operate commonly out of the airport.

Due to federal budget cuts the air traffic control tower was to close in 2013, but FAA funding was restored before closure took place.

Airlines and destinations

Incidents

On 4 June 2007 a Mooney M-20-P crashed into the woods south of the airport while on final approach. One person was killed.

In March 2010 the airport was temporarily closed due to severe flooding.

References

External links
 Norwood Memorial Airport (official site)
 Flight Level Norwood
 

Norwood, Massachusetts
Airports in Norfolk County, Massachusetts

Closed installations of the United States Navy